The Sun & the Neon Light is the third studio album by Berlin-based electronic band Booka Shade, released on 26 May 2008 on Get Physical Music. The album features 14 tracks, including new, shortened versions of "Karma Car" and "Planetary", both of which had been previously released as EPs on Get Physical. "Charlotte" is the lead single, released ahead of the album on 14 May.

Release on the U.S. iTunes Store has "Charlotte" instead of "Redemption" since "Redemption" is included as a bonus track,  the radio mix of "Numbers" is switched in with "Charlotte"'s position.

Track listing

References

2008 albums
Booka Shade albums